Elisa Dul (born 21 September 1998 in Oene, Gelderland) is a Dutch long track speed skater. Dul is a member of Team Zaanlander, (previously Team easyJet), trained by Jillert Anema.

Career

Junior
As a junior Dul participated at the 2016 Winter Youth Olympics and 2018 and 2018 World Junior Speed Skating Championships. At the 2017 World Junior Speed Skating Championships Dul became world junior champion in the mass start and team pursuit. At the 2018 World Junior Speed Skating Championships she became again junior world champion in the team pursuit in a junior world record. At these championships she also won bronze in the 1000 metres event, 1500 metres event and overall. In total she won five ISU Junior World Cup Speed Skating events.

Senior
Dul won the bronze medal at the 2019 KNSB Dutch Single Distance Championships in the mass start event.  Dul made her ISU Speed Skating World Cup debut during the 2018-19 World Cup in Hamar, Norway in the 1000 metres event, finishing 6th in the B-division. Selected by the national coach Jan Coopmans, Dul competed at the 2019-20 ISU Speed Skating World Cup in Nagano, Japan in the mass start and team pursuit events.

Records

Personal records

As of 26 December 2022

Tournament overview

source:

References

1998 births
Sportspeople from Gelderland
Dutch female speed skaters
Living people
Speed skaters at the 2016 Winter Youth Olympics
21st-century Dutch women